The 1970 NCAA College Division football rankings are from the United Press International poll of College Division head coaches and from the Associated Press poll of sportswriters and broadcasters. The 1970 NCAA College Division football season was the 13th year UPI published a Coaches Poll in what was termed the "Small College" division. It was the eleventh year for the AP version of the Small College poll.

Legend

The AP poll

The UPI Coaches poll

Notes

References

Rankings
NCAA College Division football rankings